Josef Pühringer (born 30 October 1949 in Traun) is a former Austrian politician. 

From 2 March 1995 to 6 April 2017 he was the governor (Landeshauptmann) of Upper Austria. He is a member of the Austrian People's Party (ÖVP).

He is a member of several Roman Catholic student fraternities that belong to the ÖCV and the MKV.

Pühringer is imperial Knight of Honor of the Order of St. George.

References

1949 births
Living people
People from Linz-Land District
Governors of Upper Austria
Austrian Roman Catholics